Her Brother's Keeper may refer to:
"Her Brother's Keeper", an episode of Gargoyles
"Her Brother's Keeper", an episode of Saved by the Bell: The New Class
Her Brother's Keeper, a novel by Lillian Spender

See also
 Brother's keeper (disambiguation)
 My Brother's Keeper (disambiguation)
 His Brother's Keeper (disambiguation)